Eucalyptus balladoniensis, commonly known as the Balladonia mallee, is a mallee that is endemic to an area in the south of Western Australia. It has rough bark on the lower half of its stems, smooth brownish bark above, lance-shaped leaves, flower buds in groups of seven, pale yellow flowers and hemispherical to more or less spherical fruit.

Description

Flowering mainly occurs from August to October and the flowers are pale yellow.

Taxonomy and naming
The description was published in the journal Nuytsia. The specific epithet (balladoniensis) is a reference to the distribution of this eucalypt - the ending -ensis a Latin suffix "denoting place, locality [or] country".

In 1992 Ken Hill and Lawrie Johnson described two subspecies of E. balladoniensis:

 Eucalyptus balladoniensis subsp. sedens that has its buds and fruits sessile or with a very short pedicel.

Distribution and habitat
Balladonia mallee grows in dry woodland, often on sandy rises or calcareous sandy loam. Subspecies balladoniensis has a wide distribution south of the Eyre Highway but subspecies sedens only occurs between Balladonia and Zanthus.

Conservation
Both subspecies of E. balladoniensis'' are classified as "not threatened" by the Western Australian Government Department of Parks and Wildlife.

See also

List of Eucalyptus species

References

balladoniensis
Endemic flora of Western Australia
Mallees (habit)
Myrtales of Australia
Eucalypts of Western Australia
Goldfields-Esperance
Plants described in 1976
Taxa named by Ian Brooker